Anthene opalina, the opal hairtail, is a butterfly in the family Lycaenidae. It is found in southern Ethiopia, Somalia, northern and eastern Kenya and Tanzania (Dar es Salaam). The habitat consists of dry savanna.

References

Butterflies described in 1946
Anthene